Globia laeta, the red sedge borer, is a moth of the family Noctuidae. The species was first described by Herbert Knowles Morrison in 1875. It is found in North America, including Ohio, Illinois, New Jersey and Ontario.

The wingspan is about 28 mm. Adults are on wing from July to September depending on the location.

The larvae bore the stems of Sparganium species.

This species was formerly in the genus Capsula, but Capsula was renamed Globia because of a naming conflict with a mollusk.

References

External links
"Archanara laeta (Morrison, 1875)". Lepidoptera of Wayne County, Ohio.

Xyleninae
Moths described in 1875
Moths of North America